Teretia neocaledonica is a species of sea snail, a marine gastropod mollusk in the family Raphitomidae.

Description
The length of the shell attains 5.9 mm.

Distribution
This marine species occurs off New Caledonia.

References

External links
 Morassi M. & Bonfitto A. (2015). New Indo-Pacific species of the genus Teretia Norman, 1888 (Gastropoda: Raphitomidae). Zootaxa. 3911(4): 560-570

neocaledonica
Gastropods described in 2015